Gib or GIB may refer to:

Places
 Gibraltar, British overseas territory
 Gibraltar International Airport, IATA code GIB
 Gibraltar national football team, FIFA code GIB 
 Mount Gibraltar, known as The Gib, New South Wales, Australia
 Gibsonia, PA USA (15044), aka The GIB

Business and organisations
 UK Green Investment Bank, a British financial institution
 Global Infrastructure Basel Foundation, a Swiss independent, not-for-profit foundation

Science and technology
 Gibibyte, GiB, a multiple 230 of the unit byte
 Gibibit, Gib, a multiple 230 of the unit bit
 GPS intelligent buoys, acoustic positioning devices
 Ginsberg's Intelligent Bridgeplayer, 1998 world champion in computer bridge
 Gib, an obsolete spelling of jib, a horizontal beam used in many cranes
 Gib and cotter, a wedge used with a cotter pin

Other uses
 Gibs (video gaming), fragments of a destroyed video game character
 Gib, a neutered male ferret
 Gibanawa language, ISO 639-3 code gib, a form of Hausa language
 Gib series of books by Zilpha Keatley Snyder
 AnEsonGib, British youtuber
 Gib Mihăescu, Romanian writer

See also

 Jib (disambiguation)
 Gibb (disambiguation)
 Gibi-, a binary prefix meaning 10243 = 230